Secant is a term in mathematics derived from the Latin secare ("to cut"). It may refer to:
 a secant line, in geometry
 the secant variety, in algebraic geometry
 secant (trigonometry) (Latin: secans), the multiplicative inverse (or reciprocal) trigonometric function of the cosine
 the secant method, a root-finding algorithm in numerical analysis, based on secant lines to graphs of functions
 a secant ogive in nose cone designsr:Секанс